The Mitsubishi Galant Coupé FTO is a rear-wheel drive coupe produced by Japanese automaker Mitsubishi Motors from November 1971 to March 1975. "FTO" was meant to stand for Fresco Turismo Omologato, in a fine example of Japanese Italian. The compact Coupé FTO can be seen as the replacement for the earlier Mitsubishi Colt 11-F Super Sports.

The FTO was first introduced with an  1,378 cc 4G41 "Neptune" engine, until it was replaced in a February 1973 redesign by a pair of 1,597 cc 4G32 "Saturn" powerplants, offering either  or  depending on the state of tune. There was also a 1,439 cc Saturn engine, offering . In October 1973 there was a minor facelift, and the lineup was restricted to four versions as the EL, GS, and four-speed SL versions were cancelled. Production gradually came to an end in August 1975, after the introduction in March that year of the more staid Lancer Celeste.

It carried the chassis codes A61 (Neptune 1.4), A62 (Saturn 1.4), and A63 (Saturn 1.6). 1600 GSRs built before October 1974 (when safety standards were changed) received black plastic wheelarch extensions to accommodate a wider track, resulting in an even more aggressive look. The GSR also featured a standard limited slip differential.

The FTO name was again resurrected twenty years after production of the original had ceased, when the company introduced the front-wheel drive Mitsubishi FTO in 1994.

Data
Primary data sources for each model are given in the first row. Data sourced elsewhere is referenced in each individual cell where it is used.

References

 Mitsubishi Motors history, 1971–80, Mitsubishi Motors South Africa website
 Mitsubishi Galant FTO specifications, Histomobile

Coupés
Galant FTO
Rear-wheel-drive vehicles
Sports cars
Cars introduced in 1971